Castianeira variata is a species of spider in the family Corinnidae, found in North and Central America. The body length is typically 7 to 9 mm, the females being larger. Castianeira variata is similar in general appearance to C. longipalpus. The carapace dark reddish brown to nearly black with thin white hairs, darker on the sides.

References

External links

Bugguide species info page Castianeira variata
xpda, Photos from Earth Castianeira variata
World Spider Catalog Castianeira variata

Corinnidae
Spiders of North America
Spiders described in 1942
Taxa named by Willis J. Gertsch